Bernard Talvard (born 8 October 1947) is a French fencer. He won three bronze medals in the foil events at the 1972 and 1976 Summer Olympics.

References

External links

Sportspeople from Melun
1947 births
Living people
French male foil fencers
Olympic fencers of France
Fencers at the 1972 Summer Olympics
Fencers at the 1976 Summer Olympics
Olympic bronze medalists for France
Olympic medalists in fencing
Medalists at the 1972 Summer Olympics
Medalists at the 1976 Summer Olympics
20th-century French people
21st-century French people